This list of tallest buildings in Kerala ranks high-rises in Kerala, India according to their height. Kerala is one of the southern states of India. This state is witnessing a huge high-rise boom, especially in Kochi,  Kozhikode,Thrissur, and Thiruvananthapuram. Several high-rises are located in these cities. As of 2017, Choice Paradise, located in Kochi, is the tallest building in Kerala with a total height of 137 metres (450 ft) and with 40 floors. Galaxy atmosphere building in Kozhikode with 167 meters (548 feet) and 50 floors is the tallest upcoming building in Kerala.

Tallest buildings
This lists ranks buildings in Kerala that stand at least  from the ground. This includes spires and architectural details but does not include antenna masts. Only completed buildings that have been topped out are included.

Upcoming projects

See also 
 List of tallest buildings in India
 List of tallest buildings in Kochi
 List of tallest buildings in Trivandrum
 List of tallest buildings in Thrissur

References 

Kerala
Tallest